Norwegian National Road 3 (Rv3) is a Norwegian national road that is the main route through the Østerdalen district in Eastern Norway. It has been dubbed  which means 'the green shortcut' by the old Hedmark County Municipality. The route runs south from European Route E6 at Ulsberg in the municipality of Rennebu in Trøndelag county, via Tynset and Elverum, to Stange in Innlandet county, where it rejoins European Route E6.

National Road 3 is the route most used for transport between Oslo and Trondheim, carrying approximately 90% of heavy traffic and most of the passenger car traffic between the two cities. This is because the route is about  shorter in comparison to European Route E6, has better curvature, goes through fewer towns, and has smaller grades. Unlike the E6 over the Dovrefjell mountain range, National Road 3 is also never closed due to winter weather. There have therefore been proposals to reroute the E6 to Østerdalen (along the route of National Road 3). This is however not the official plan. Much less is spent on Road 3, although  of four-lane motorway was opened in 2020, but not much more investment is planned.

History
From 1965 to 1992, National Road 3 followed a route from Ulsberg to Kongsvinger via Tynset and Elverum. The segment between Løten and Ommangsvolden was designated National Road 211. As part of the 1992 European route reform, the route from Elverum to Kongsvinger was redesignated National Road 20, and is now part of National Road 2.

It is part of the newly built segment of the road between Skjærodden and Nygarden in the municipality of Åmot.

A new  four-lane motorway (between Løten and Elverum) and  more new road was opened in 2020.

References

003
Roads in Innlandet
Roads in Trøndelag